Sound Transit's Link light rail in Washington state consists of two lines, Central Link and Tacoma Link. A 21-mile line was approved by a ballot measure in 1996. However, a series of financial missteps and planning errors resulted in escalating costs and delayed construction. The 21-mile line was shortened to a 14-mile line running from Westlake Center in downtown Seattle south to SEA-TAC Airport, and opened in 2009. Federal grants received in 2005 funded a northern extension to the University of Washington in 2016.

The Sound Transit 2 ballot measure to fund several new lines and extensions passed in 2008. The system will be extended north in Lynnwood, east to the Microsoft campus in Redmond, and south to the Kent-Des Moines area. The measure originally funded an extension further south to Federal Way, but unexpectedly low tax revenue resulting from the Great Recession left Sound Transit without the funds to complete it.

Predecessors
Transit in Seattle was first seriously considered in the Forward Thrust ballot measure placed on the ballot in 1968. The 1968 vote featured 13 different ballot measures, some for Seattle and some for all of King County. The rapid transit ballot measure failed at the ballot box. Four of these measures, including the rapid transit measure, was placed on the ballot again in 1970, but all four failed a second time. After the failed vote in 1970, the federal transit funding instead went to build the MARTA system in Atlanta.

Early years
In 1996, voters in King, Pierce, and Snohomish counties approved increases in sales taxes and vehicle excise taxes to pay for a US$3.9 billion transit package that included $1.7 billion for a 25-mile light rail system. The system included a line in Tacoma, Washington, and another line from the University District in north Seattle to Sea-Tac Airport south of Seattle, originally planned to open in 2006.  Two years later the recently created Sound Transit revealed an environmental impact study that increased the cost of the project to US $2.2 billion and added three miles to the line by adding connections to Northgate. However, the study was quickly met with objections from the poorer neighborhoods south Seattle in Rainier Valley that complained that the plan unfairly impacted their neighborhoods by having the line running on the surface instead of below ground like much of the rest of the route starting at Beacon Hill.  Tukwila city leaders were also concerned that route bypassed the important shopping district around Southcenter Mall.

Decline 

Beginning in early 1999, the light rail program became beset with problems that mired Sound Transit and local governments in political ire. In late February 1999, a financial analysis stated that building light rail out as far as Northgate might not be possible for over a dozen years due to decreases in the amount of federal grant money available to local transit authorities and Seattle-North King County having used so much of its local taxing authority and ability to borrow money to pay for light rail. A vote by the Sound Transit board on February 25, 1999, that made only minor modifications to the route, did little to ease the concerns Seattle's southern neighborhoods and northern and southern suburbs.  Increasing land values and the changes to the route voted in by the board added hundreds of millions of dollars to the cost, requiring cuts to the plan to bring the project back to within budget. The cuts were finalized in a November vote that deferred construction on two stations, to only partially build the station under Beacon Hill, and route modifications.

Differences between the University of Washington and Sound Transit over station locations, impacts from the route's running under several science buildings on the campus, and construction impact deferments threatened to delay the project and raise costs. After months of negotiations, University regents and Sound Transit reached agreement in April 2000 with Sound Transit agreeing to install dampeners on the rails that run under the science buildings, air cushions to tables in the science buildings, and to mitigate environmental impacts due to construction and traffic impacts from having the station on university grounds. However, in November, the Sound Transit board voted to defer construction on the tunnel to the university when the construction estimate came in $171 million over budget. This news prompted concerns that Sound Transit could lose out on $500 million in federal grants, but King County Executive Ron Sims said he had been in contact with FTA officials who said the grant was still possible. This announcement coincided with the resignation of light rail's chief, Paul Bay. Two weeks later, Lyndon Wilson Jr., the man credited with turning around Portland's MAX Light Rail project, was tapped as the systems interim director.

Within days of Wilson's arrival, more bad news came out as new estimates from Sound Transit staff increased the cost of the 21-mile project from $1.9 billion to $3.8 billion and added three years to the construction time. The report cited the frequent changes made to the route in order to appease community members, third parties, and the wishes of board members and the ambitious construction schedule as reasons for the cost increase. Just days later, Capitol Hill business and civic leaders withdrew their support from the project due to concerns that two years of construction needed to build the station on Capitol Hill would drive customers away from area businesses and force those businesses to close.

In January 2001, the Sound Transit board accepted a $500 million grant from the FTA even though the FTA had not completed the review of the project it started when the cost overruns were announced in December and had not offered Sound Transit the grant.  The decision effectively locked Sound Transit into building a 7-mile route from Lander Street to the University of Washington. Days later, the chairman of the House Appropriations transportation subcommittee, Hal Rogers (R-KY) sent a letter to Transportation Secretary Rodney Slater saying his committee could not approve the grant and requesting a review by the Inspector General. Despite this, Sound Transit was still optimistic that the grant would be approved later that week. Representative Jennifer Dunn (R-Bellevue), Washington's ranking House Republican, voiced her support for the independent audit, but stopped short of calling for the FTA to not approve the grant. Despite these questions, on his last day as Transportation Secretary, Rodney Slater, signed the agreement granting Sound Transit $500 million in annual installments through 2006.

However, the grant approval still was not enough to prevent the resignation of Sound Transit's executive director, Bob White. White cited a need for new leadership to restore public confidence in the agency.

March 2001 was another difficult month for the light rail project. On March 9, Sound Transit's citizen oversight committee criticized the agency's optimistic assumptions about building costs, its reliance on receiving an additional $931 million in federal grants, and that the agency was in danger of repeating prior mistakes. The next day, Representative Rogers summoned Sound Transit and its opponents to Washington, D.C. to testify in front of his subcommittee about the "problem" project. By the end of March, Link light rail was in danger of losing its first installment of federal grant money as Rogers noted the project's local opposition, cost overruns, and reliance on record levels of federal money as troubling.

In April, the Seattle City Council's unwavering support started to falter when a proposal requesting a Sound Transit citizen panel to explore alternatives to light rail was proposed by Councilman Nick Licata.  The proposal would have had little to no effect on Sound Transit's plans if it had passed in its proposed form, but by the time it passed the contents of the proposal had been replaced with language praising the agency and explaining the cost overruns as unavoidable and out of Sound Transit's control. Avoiding the City Council's attack was only a short term victory as the next date the US Inspector General's office recommended that federal funding be suspended until the agency is able to provide a final estimate for the project. The Inspector General's report also estimated the cost of the project at $4.1 billion, meaning the cost of the project had increased by $2.5 billion in seven months.  The day after the IG's report brought a suspension of the $75 million federal grant for the next year, Sound Transit learned that the $50 million grant from the current year was also in danger.

Shortening of the line 

On April 9, 2001, Mayor Paul Schell sent a letter requesting that due to the challenges facing the northern segment of the route (South Lander Street to the University District), Sound Transit should focus on building the southern fourteen miles of the line.  Schell's proposal was supported by one of his mayoral election rivals, Greg Nickels, and King County Commissioner Ron Sims, but Sims also suggested continuing the line beyond South Lander and into the bus tunnel. However, Councilman Licata was of the opinion that Schell's proposal didn't go far enough because it did not consider scrapping light rail completely and focusing the money on carpool lanes and expanding the monorail.

Part of Schell's request was for the review board to find out if it would be possible to build the southern route without federal assistance, but within days Sound Transit's acting executive director said federal assistance would still be required, an opinion that was echoed by the acting light-rail director.  The day after saying the southern route could not be built without federal money, Sound Transit admitted that its current plans for light rail was no longer feasible due to a decrease in the amount of money it expected to get from the federal government, which caused at least a $190 million shortfall. However, there was hope that with modifications to the route, stations, or the amount of tunneling the full 21 miles could still be built. By the end of the month, Sound Transit staffers revealed that it was unlikely that the whole project could be completed before the end of the decade, but some of it could be completed.

Despite all of the problems with cost overruns and schedule slippages related to the project, a poll conducted by Elway Research for The Seattle Times and Northwest Cable News between April 28 and May 1 revealed that only 40 percent of Puget Sound voters wanted to put a stop to a project, with 37 percent wanting to build a smaller line with existing funds, and 14 percent in favor of increasing taxes to pay for the full line. This contrasts with when Sound Move passed in 1996. At that time, 54 percent of Seattle residents favored stopping the project.

By late May 2001, Sound Transit's board began to seriously consider shortening the line, including what to do with the money allocated to light rail if it was scrapped.  Support in the board began to form around four alternative plans, two of which included a tunnel through Capitol Hill that divided the board, with Ron Sims saying "Taking us to Capitol Hill is fatal to any light-rail project". Sims would later join a group of current and former community leaders sent a letter to the board urging them to develop a route through South Lake Union to avoid the tunnel through Capitol Hill.

In June, it was announced that two key staff members would be leaving the project: the interim director, Lyndon Wilson, and chief engineer, Bill Houppermans.  Two current staffers were chosen as interim replacements.

The board decided to instruct staffers to focus their attention on building the southern segment of the line in late June and to provide alternatives to choose from by September. Supporters of the plan noted that by building the southern segment Sound Transit would be showing that they can get something built and that once it is built, money and support would follow. Critics said that by focusing on the southern segment the line wouldn't attract as many riders and that major population and job centers would not be serviced.

Revitalization 

The decision to shorten the line from 21 miles to 14 miles marked a turning point for the embattled project. While the path to completion would not be trouble-free, Sound Transit would at least make progress towards starting construction.

Amidst the turmoil caused by the resignation of two of the light rail project's high-ranking members and decisions regarding the shortening of the line, Sound Transit received some good news when a federal court judge lifted a court injunction preventing them from contacting Rainier Valley residents about purchasing their property and tossed out a majority of the lawsuit filed by other Rainier Valley residents. Of the three issues in the lawsuit, the judge removed two of the claims made by the residents' group, the first claim that was tossed out was that Sound Transit was violating the Fair Housing Act and the other that it was violating the National Environmental Policy Act.  The one claim that the judge left in the lawsuit was whether Sound Transit intentionally discriminated against Rainier Valley by choosing a surface option instead of tunneling through the valley as it had done in more affluent and less racially and ethnically diverse neighborhoods. A month later, in August, the Rainier Valley group dropped the remaining issue of discrimination due to a lack of funds to continue the lawsuit and because Sound Transit had not yet finalized the route.

Light rail would soon have competition to provide mass transit to Seattle.  All three of the major candidates for mayor of Seattle in 2001 endorsed a monorail project despite no details being known about the project. According to the head of the University of Washington's Transportation Research Center, "Maybe the best thing going for monorail is that it's not light rail." However, while the Seattle Monorail Project would ultimately pass a referendum in 2002, it too would be plagued by many of the same cost overruns and delays that afflicted Link Light Rail and in 2005, Seattle residents voted against a new plan and essentially killed the monorail project.

In September 2001, the Sound Transit Board announced that they had enough money to fund a 14-mile route, later to be called Central Link, that began in Downtown Seattle at the Washington State Convention and Trade Center, proceeded through Downtown in the Metro Transit Tunnel, then through Rainier Valley and Tukwila before ending one mile short of Sea-Tac Airport. The decision to stop this "starter" line a mile short of the airport would later be criticized by light rails opponents, but the explanation provided by Sound Transit was that it was that the designs were not completed for a planned remodel of Sea-Tac and that they only had $12 million to extend the line when the projected cost to do so was between $350 million and $500 million. An audit by Deloitte & Touche discovered that while Sound Transit was much better than before, it still ran a risk of cost overruns by not having better procedures to control scope creep.

On September 25, the Sound Transit Board finally voted to approve the new, shorter, 14-mile line with an estimated cost of $2.1 billion, clearing the way for construction to begin as early as the summer of 2002. While concerns were raised that the project was wasting money, others noted that it was time to get construction started. The line was officially approved on November 29, but some opponents threatened lawsuits to stop construction.

At the end of 2001 and beginning of 2002, the project encountered more conflict.  After having most of their lawsuit dismissed by a federal judge in mid-July and then dropping the remainder in August, the Rainier Valley community group filed an appeal on December 26, stating the judge had incorrectly ruled when dismissing the discrimination claims. Tim Eyman, a political activist known in Washington for filing anti-tax initiatives and referendums, filed an initiative that would remove an excise tax on car tabs that goes to transit, while another group of opponents threatened a referendum to block light rail from using the Downtown bus tunnel. The result of the initiative, if passed, would remove $67 million of funding from Sound Transit's $270 million annual income. Yet another group questioned the legality of the shortened line, urged Sound Transit to have another public vote, and threatened legal action if Sound Transit did not listen to its urging. Sound Transit declined the request citing that they would be required to pay for both their court costs and their opponents, bonds were not needed for another two years, and the legal proceedings would tie Sound Transit's hands politically.

In late January 2002, Sound Transit began working to repair their image in the nation's capital and paid a visit to federal officials to show that the project had left behind its problems from the previous year.

Ron Sims, Sound Transit's chairman, announced that it may be possible to extend the line to the University of Washington without raising taxes as long as route modifications to the route saved enough money, they were able to get help from the federal government, and their financial plans were changed to allow more borrowing. The route to the University had previously been narrowed down to two options both with tunnels under Lake Washington Ship Canal, one under Montlake Cut and another near University Bridge.

Construction 

In March 2002, Sound Transit began the process of acquiring land in the Rainier Valley, including all of 64 properties and parts of 232 others. Sound Transit was also informed that Link Light Rail received a rating of "Recommended" from the Federal Transit Administration, making it eligible for federal funding. The Seattle City Council and King County made over $50 million in investments in the neighborhood to compensate for the light rail, including paying off small business loans, burying power lines, and other community developments.

The main line from Tukwila International Boulevard to Downtown Seattle (Westlake Center) opened in July 2009, followed closely by the final station at Seattle-Tacoma International Airport in December 2009. The extension from Downtown to the University of Washington via Capitol Hill opened March 19, 2016. Angle Lake station, planned as a Sound Transit 2 project, also opened in 2016. The Northgate extension opened three stations simultaneously at the U District, Roosevelt, and Northgate in October 2021.

Temporary Link Light Rail Airport Connector Bus 
Sound Transit contracted with Pierce Transit to operate an interim shuttle bus from the initial endpoint of Central Link at Tukwila International Blvd Station to SeaTac/Airport Station until the extension to the airport was finished. Pierce Transit was awarded the contract in February 2009, as an expansion of their contract to operate a connector bus between Tacoma Dome Station and Lakewood Station. This service ran every ten to fifteen minutes in both directions until the end of the day on December 19, 2009, when direct light rail service to the airport commenced.

References

Link light rail
History of transportation in Washington (state)